Pyrgus cashmirensis is a butterfly of the family Hesperiidae. It is found in Tajikistan, north-eastern Afghanistan, northern Pakistan and Kashmir.

Subspecies
Pyrgus cashmirensis cashmirensis
Pyrgus cashmirensis pseudoalpinus Alberti, 1952 (north-eastern Afghanistan, Pakistan)
Pyrgus cashmirensis pumilus de Jong, 1979 (Ghissar, Alai, Darvaz, Pamirs)

References

Butterflies described in 1874
Pyrgus
Butterflies of Asia
Taxa named by Frederic Moore